Alhassan Dahamani (born June 6, 1968) is a Ghanaian politician and member of the Sixth Parliament of the Fourth Republic of Ghana representing the Tamale North Constituency in the Northern Region as an independent.

Personal life 
Dahamani is a Muslim. He is married (with three children).

Early life and education 
Dahamani was born on June 6, 1968. He hails from Damankunyilli – Tamale, a town in the Northern Region of Ghana. He entered University of Cape Coast, Ghana and obtained his bachelor's in Management Studies in 2008.

Politics 
In 2012, he contested as an independent for the Tamale North seat on the ticket of the sixth parliament of the fourth republic and won.

Employment 
 Senior Administrative Assistant, VRA-NEDCo, Sunyani
 Administrator

References 

1968 births
Living people
21st-century Ghanaian politicians
Ghanaian MPs 2013–2017
Ghanaian MPs 2017–2021
Independent politicians